A warblog or milblog is a weblog devoted mostly or wholly to covering news events concerning an ongoing war.  Sometimes the use of the term "warblog" implies that the blog concerned has a pro-war slant.  The term "milblog" implies that the author is a member of, or has some connection to the military; the more specific term "soldierblog" is sometimes used for the former.

History
The coinage 'warblog' is attributed to Matt Welch, who started his War Blog within days of the September 11 attacks. In the fall of 2001, the attacks gave rise to a "war-blogging movement," which favoured political punditry over the often personal and technological orientation that had dominated the blog genre up to that point, achieving much greater public and media recognition than earlier blogs. Most warblogs supported the US-led War in Afghanistan and the Iraq War from a hawkish perspective.

Warblogging was popularized by Glenn Reynolds, whose Instapundit was one of the most popular political blogs on the web.  Some prominent warblogs, such as Little Green Footballs by Charles Johnson and Daily Dish by Andrew Sullivan existed before September 11, but made the war on terror their primary focus afterwards. Other notable warblogs included Dynamist by Virginia Postrel, KausFiles by Mickey Kaus, Talking Points Memo by Josh Marshall, KenLayne.com by Ken Layne, and Lileks.com by James Lileks.

The readership of warblogs dramatically increased in March 2003, following the U.S. invasion of Iraq, with readers chiefly attracted by the offer of perspectives absent from most news reports; the pseudonymous Salam Pax, an Iraqi national who was posting first-hand accounts from Baghdad, emerged as a prominent war blogger. Media organisations that started their own reporters' warblog at this point included the BBC, the Christian Science Monitor, and the Seattle Post-Intelligencer. In the first half of 2003, CNN, The Hartford Courant, and Time were among the media organizations that prohibited staff reporters from covering US-led wars first-hand in their personal blogs for fear both of legal repercussions and of competition from such blogs.

Most blogs that gained popularity as "warblogs" expanded their focus to politics and general news, usually from a right-of-center perspective, yet continued to be commonly known as warblogs. While warblogs arose in response to the post-September-11 wars and mostly limited their commentary to them, some moved on to related political, social and cultural issues and continued after the end of the wars.

Milblogs
Military blogs emerged with the Iraq War in 2003. Initially named "warblogs" as well, they became popular under the name "milblogging" in 2004. In October 2005, a U.S. soldier named Jean-Paul Borda launched the blog aggregator Milblogging.com. A milblog is primarily focused on the events of the military, written about by those with inside knowledge of the military, whether an active soldier, a veteran of the military, a spouse of a soldier, or a civilian with a special connection to the military.

Milblogs often criticized the media coverage of the wars in Afghanistan and Iraq, seeking to correct what they saw as biased or negative reporting. Thus, Matt Burden of Blackfive.net cites as the rationale of his blog the death in combat of a fellow soldier and good friend of his, who died saving the life of a magazine reporter, yet had his death go unreported by the magazine. One milblogger chose to offer his site "as an educational service to the American People who wish to know the true story of Iraq and Afghanistan." Other milblogs cite similar intentions to report the news that they did not feel the mainstream media was reporting.

C.J. Grisham was among the first active duty soldiers to become a milblogger when he opened A Soldier's Perspective in December 2004. Within five years, ASP was receiving an average of 1,500 visitors per day (nearly 1 million in total) from over 120 countries and was ranked the second most popular site on Milblogging.com.

In 2005, there were fewer than 200 "milblogs" in existence.  In July 2011, Milblogging.com listed more than 3,000 military blogs in 46 countries.  The top 5 locations were US, Iraq, Afghanistan, the United Kingdom, and Germany. During the 2022 war in Ukraine, Russian milblogs became increasingly quoted.

Response by U.S. Military
Military blogs became accepted within a few years. Whereas secretary of defense Donald Rumsfeld was at first believed to be skeptical of military blogs, by 2007 president George W. Bush lauded them as "an important voice for the cause of freedom."

Official oversight of websites maintained by military personnel deployed to the Middle East began in 2002. The oversight mission consisted of active-duty soldiers and contractors, as well as Guard and Reserve members from Maryland, Texas and Washington state. Its remit was expanded in August 2005.

In Iraq, commanding officers shut down a blog that reported on the medical response to a suicide bombing that had taken place in late 2004 in Mosul. The Army Web Risk Assessment Cell was created to monitor compliance with military regulations. In April 2005, a four-page document of regulations was issued by Multi-National Corps-Iraq, directing all military bloggers in Iraq to register with their units, and commanders to conduct quarterly reviews to make sure bloggers were not disclosing casualty numbers or violating operational security or privacy rules. Some milbloggers took down or altered their blogs for fear of violating the regulation that many of them believed to be too ambiguous. The regulations were updated in April 2007 but, according to many bloggers in war theatres, failed to resolve their ambiguities.

Although the U.S. Department of Defense was initially concerned about milblogs as a potential OPSEC violation, it eventually embraced the concept and attempted to implement official versions of milblogs.  Official milblogs did not receive the same reception or popularity of the unofficial milblogs as they were written in the same dull language as other official publications of the Defense Department.

See also

 List of blogging terms

References